GOB is the first studio album by British rapper/graphic designer DELS, released on 2 May 2011. The album was recorded between 2009 and 2011 in London and in Dels' studio at his mother's house in Ipswich. It was produced by Joe Goddard of Hot Chip, alongside Micachu and Kwes.

Reception
Upon its release, 'GOB' has received good reviews from music critics. The website Metacritic has given the album an aggregated score of 80/100.

Track listing

Compact Disc/Digital Album

Vinyl LP 
Double album vinyl LP release.

Personnel
Dels – Vocals
Tracks 1, 4, 5, 8, 9, 10 and 11 - produced by Kwes.
Tracks 3 and 7 - additional production by Kwes.
Tracks 2, 3, 7 and 12 - produced by Joe Goddard
Tracks 6 and 8 - produced by Micachu
Joe Goddard - Guest vocalist
Elan Tamara - Guest vocalist
Roots Manuva - Guest vocalist
Ghostpoet - Guest vocalist
Mixed by Bob Earland
Mastered By Kevin Metcalfe
Vocals recorded by Elijah Turay
Art Direction by Us Design Studio & Dels
A&R - Will Ashon

References

2011 debut albums
Dels albums
Big Dada albums
Ninja Tune albums
Albums produced by Kwes